Greg F. Gifune (born November 12, 1963, in Middlesex County, Massachusetts) is a  horror author, the recipient of multiple Bram Stoker Award and International Horror Guild Award nominations in addition to one for the British Fantasy Award.

Christopher Rice calls Gifune, "The best writer of horror novels and supernatural thrillers at work today."

Gifune has written 17 novels, in addition to screenplays and published collections of short stories.

He is also the editor-in-chief of Thievin' Kitty Publications (Link) and the former editor—from 1998 to 2004—of the fiction magazine The Edge: Tales of Suspense (Link).

A full-time author and editor, Gifune resides in Marion, Massachusetts, with his wife Carol and a bevy of felines.  As of 2011 he was living in Wareham, Massachusetts.

Bibliography 

Heretics (collection)
 Aug. 2001 50-copy Limited Edition Hardcover (Delirium Books)
 Aug. 2001 250-copy Limited Edition Trade Paperback (Delirium Books)

Drago Descending
 Nov. 2001 Trade Paperback (The Fiction Works)

Saying Uncle
 Feb. 2003 Trade Paperback (December Girl Press/Delirium Books)

Night Work
 March 2003 Trade Paperback (The Fiction Works)
 June 2004 Trade Paperback (BookSurge Publishing)

The Bleeding Season
 Oct. 2003 250-copy Limited Edition Hardcover (Delirium Books)

Down To Sleep (collection)
 May 2004 77-copy Limited Edition Hardcover (Delirium Books)

Deep Night
 Oct. 2005 26-copy Deluxe Edition Hardcover (Delirium Books)
 Oct. 2005 150-copy Limited Edition Hardcover (Delirium Books)
 June 2006 Trade Paperback (Delirium Books)

A View From The Lake
 Jan. 2006 Trade Paperback (Blindside Publishing)

Dominion
 Jun. 2007 275-copy Limited Edition Hardcover (Delirium Books)

Blood in Electric Blue
 2008 Hardcover (Delirium Books)
 Feb. 2009 Trade Paperback (Delirium Books)

Judas Goat
 2008 Limited Edition Hardcover (Morning Star)
 Oct. 2010 E-Book (DarkFuse)

Children of Chaos
 2009 Hardcover and Trade Paperback (Delirium Books).

Kingdom of Shadows
 Dec. 2009 E-Book (DarkFuse)
 2009 Trade Paperback (Delirium Books)
 Jan. 2010 Limited Edition Hardcover (Delirium Books)

Sorcerer
 Oct. 2010 E-Book(DarkFuse)

Long After Dark
 Feb. 2010 Limited Edition Hardcover (Delirium Books)
 Jun. 2013 Trade Paperback (Delirium Books)

Gardens of Night
 Jan. 2010 Signed Limited Edition Hardcover (Uninvited Books)
 Oct. 2010 Trade Paperback (Uninvited Books)

Catching Hell
 May 2010 Hardcover (Cemetery Dance Publications)
 Nov. 2011 E-Book (Samhain Publishing)

The Living and the Dead
 2010 Signed Limited Edition Hardcover (Delirium Books)
 Jun. 2013 E-Book (DarkFuse)

Dreams the Ragman
 2011 Hardcover (Delirium Books)

Midnight Solitaire
 Aug. 2011 Hardcover (Delirium Books)

Lords of Twilight
 Dec. 2011 E-Book(DarkFuse)
 2012 Hardcover (Delirium Books)

Apartment Seven
 2011 Hardcover (Delirium Books)
 Jan. 2014 E-Book(DarkFuse)

External links

See also
List of horror fiction authors

References

1963 births
Living people
21st-century American novelists
American horror writers
American male novelists
Novelists from Massachusetts
People from Framingham, Massachusetts
People from Marion, Massachusetts
American male short story writers
21st-century American short story writers
21st-century American male writers